Several distinct periods of Cypriot intercommunal violence involving the two main ethnic communities, Greek Cypriots and Turkish Cypriots, marked mid-20th century Cyprus. These included the Cyprus Emergency of 1955–59 during British rule, the post-independence Cyprus crisis of 1963–64, and the Cyprus crisis of 1967. Hostilities culminated in the 1974 de facto division of the island along the Green Line following the Turkish invasion of Cyprus. The region has been relatively peaceful since then, but the Cyprus dispute has continued, with various attempts to solve it diplomatically having been generally unsuccessful.

Background

Cyprus, an island lying in the eastern Mediterranean, hosted a population of Greeks and Turks (four-fifths and one-fifth, respectively), who lived under British rule in the late nineteenth-century and the first half of the twentieth-century. Christian Orthodox Church of Cyprus played a prominent political role among the Greek Cypriot community, a privilege that it acquired during the Ottoman Empire with the employment of the millet system, which gave the archbishop an unofficial ethnarch status.

Enosis and taksim
The repeated rejections by the British of Greek Cypriot demands for enosis, union with Greece, led to armed resistance, organised by the National Organization of Cypriot Struggle, or EOKA. EOKA, led by the Greek-Cypriot commander George Grivas, systematically targeted British colonial authorities. One of the effects of EOKA's campaign was to alter the Turkish position from demanding full reincorporation into Turkey to a demand for taksim (partition). EOKA's mission and activities caused a "Cretan syndrome" (see Turkish Resistance Organisation) within the Turkish Cypriot community, as its members feared that they would be forced to leave the island in such a case as had been the case with Cretan Turks. As such, they preferred the continuation of British colonial rule and then taksim, the division of the island. Due to the Turkish Cypriots' support for the British, EOKA's leader, Georgios Grivas, declared them to be enemies. The fact that the Turks were a minority was, according to Nihat Erim, to be addressed by the transfer of thousands of Turks from mainland Turkey so that Greek Cypriots would cease to be the majority. When Erim visited Cyprus as the Turkish representative, he was advised by Field Marshal Sir John Harding, the then Governor of Cyprus, that Turkey should send educated Turks to settle in Cyprus.

Turkey actively promoted the idea that on the island of Cyprus two distinctive communities existed, and sidestepped its former claim that “the people of Cyprus were all Turkish subjects”. In doing so, Turkey’s aim to have self-determination of two to-be equal communities in effect led to de jure partition of the island. This could be justified to the international community against the will of the majority Greek population of the island. Dr. Fazil Küçük in 1954 had already proposed Cyprus be divided in two at the 35° parallel.

Causes of intercommunal violence 
Lindley Dan, from Notre Dame University, spotted the roots of intercommunal violence to different visions among the two communities of Cyprus (enosis for Greek Cypriots, taksim for Turkish Cypriots). Also, Lindlay wrote that "the merging of church, schools/education, and politics in divisive and nationalistic ways" had played a crucial role in creation of havoc in Cyprus' history. Attalides Michael also pointed to the opposing nationalisms as the cause of the Cyprus problem.

Crisis of 1955–1959 

The British started recruiting Turkish Cypriots into the police force that patrolled Cyprus to fight the EOKA. EOKA targeted colonial authorities, including police, but Georgios Grivas, the leader of EOKA, did not initially wish to open up a new front by fighting Turkish Cypriots and reassured them that EOKA would not harm their people. In 1956, some Turkish Cypriot policemen were killed by EOKA members and this provoked some intercommunal violence in the spring and summer, but these attacks on policemen were not motivated by the fact that they were Turkish Cypriots. However, in January 1957, Grivas changed his policy as his forces in the mountains became increasingly pressured by the British Crown forces. In order to divert the attention of the Crown forces, EOKA members started to target Turkish Cypriot policemen intentionally in the towns, so that Turkish Cypriots would riot against the Greek Cypriots and the security forces would have to be diverted to the towns to restore order. The killing of a Turkish Cypriot policeman on 19 January, when a power station was bombed, and the injury of three others, provoked three days of intercommunal violence in Nicosia. The two communities targeted each other in reprisals, at least one Greek Cypriot was killed and the British Army was deployed in the streets. Greek Cypriot stores were burned and their neighbourhoods attacked. Following the events, the Greek Cypriot leadership spread the propaganda that the riots had merely been an act of Turkish Cypriot aggression. Such events created chaos and drove the communities apart both in Cyprus and in Turkey.

On 22 October 1957 Sir Hugh Mackintosh Foot replaced Sir John Harding as the British Governor of Cyprus. Foot suggested five to seven years of self-government before any final decision. His plan rejected both enosis and taksim. The Turkish Cypriot response to this plan was a series of anti-British demonstrations in Nicosia on 27 and 28 January 1958 rejecting the proposed plan because the plan did not include partition. The British then withdrew the plan.

In 1957, Black Gang, a Turkish Cypriot pro-taksim paramilitary organisation, was formed to patrol a Turkish Cypriot enclave, the Tahtakale district of Nicosia, against activities of EOKA. The organisation later attempted to grow into a national scale, but failed to gain public support.

By 1958, signs of dissatisfaction with the British increased on both sides, with a group of Turkish Cypriots forming Volkan (later renamed to the Turkish Resistance Organisation) paramilitary group to promote partition and the annexation of Cyprus to Turkey as dictated by the Menderes plan. Volkan initially consisted of roughly 100 members, with the stated aim of raising awareness in Turkey of the Cyprus issue and courting military training and support for Turkish Cypriot fighters from the Turkish government.

In June 1958, the British Prime Minister, Harold Macmillan, was expected to propose a plan to resolve the Cyprus issue. In light of the new development, the Turks rioted in Nicosia to promote the idea that Greek and Turkish Cypriots could not live together and therefore any plan that did not include partition would not be viable. This violence was soon followed by bombing, Greek Cypriot deaths and looting of Greek Cypriot-owned shops and houses. Greek and Turkish Cypriots started to flee mixed population villages where they were a minority in search of safety. This was effectively the beginning of the segregation of the two communities. On 7 June 1958, a bomb exploded at the entrance of the Turkish Embassy in Cyprus. Following the bombing, Turkish Cypriots looted Greek Cypriot properties. On 26 June 1984, the Turkish Cypriot leader, Rauf Denktaş, admitted on British channel ITV that the bomb was placed by the Turks themselves in order to create tension. On 9 January 1995, Rauf Denktaş repeated his claim to the famous Turkish newspaper Milliyet in Turkey.

The crisis reached a climax on 12 June 1958, when eight Greeks, out of an armed group of thirty five arrested by soldiers of the Royal Horse Guards on suspicion of preparing an attack on the Turkish quarter of Skylloura, were killed in a suspected attack by Turkish Cypriot locals, near the village of Geunyeli, having been ordered to walk back to their village of Kondemenos.

Republic of Cyprus
After the EOKA campaign had begun, the British government successfully began to turn the Cyprus issue from a British colonial problem into a Greek-Turkish issue. British diplomacy exerted backstage influence on the Adnan Menderes government, with the aim of making Turkey active in Cyprus. For the British, the attempt had a twofold objective. The EOKA campaign would be silenced as quickly as possible, and Turkish Cypriots would not side with Greek Cypriots against the British colonial claims over the island, which would thus remain under the British. The Turkish Cypriot leadership visited Menderes to discuss the Cyprus issue. When asked how the Turkish Cypriots should respond to the Greek Cypriot claim of enosis, Menderes replied: "You should go to the British foreign minister and request the status quo be prolonged, Cyprus to remain as a British colony". When the Turkish Cypriots visited the British Foreign Secretary and requested for Cyprus to remain a colony, he replied: "You should not be asking for colonialism at this day and age, you should be asking for Cyprus be returned to Turkey, its former owner".

As Turkish Cypriots began to look to Turkey for protection, Greek Cypriots soon understood that enosis was extremely unlikely. The Greek Cypriot leader, Archbishop  Makarios III, now set independence for the island as his objective.

Britain resolved to solve the dispute by creating an independent Cyprus. In 1959, all involved parties signed the Zurich Agreements: Britain, Turkey, Greece, and the Greek and Turkish Cypriot leaders, Makarios and Dr. Fazil Kucuk, respectively. The new constitution drew heavily on the ethnic composition of the island. The President would be a Greek Cypriot, and the Vice-President a Turkish Cypriot with an equal veto. The contribution to the public service would be set at a ratio of 70:30, and the Supreme Court would consist of an equal number of judges from both communities as well as an independent judge who was not Greek, Turkish or British. The Zurich Agreements were supplemented by a number of treaties. The Treaty of Guarantee stated that secession or union with any state was forbidden, and that Greece, Turkey and Britain would be given guarantor status to intervene if that was violated. The Treaty of Alliance allowed for two small Greek and Turkish military contingents to be stationed on the island, and the Treaty of Establishment gave Britain sovereignty over two bases in Akrotiri and Dhekelia.

On 15 August 1960, the Colony of Cyprus became fully independent as the Republic of Cyprus. The new republic remained within the Commonwealth of Nations.

The new constitution brought dissatisfaction to Greek Cypriots, who felt it to be highly unjust for them for historical, demographic and contributional reasons. Although 80% of the island's population were Greek Cypriots and these indigenous people had lived on the island for thousands of years and paid 94% of taxes, the new constitution was giving the 17% of the population that was Turkish Cypriots, who paid 6% of taxes, around 30% of government jobs and 40% of national security jobs.

Crisis of 1963–1964

Proposed constitutional amendments and the Akritas plan

Within three years tensions between the two communities in administrative affairs began to show. In particular disputes over separate municipalities and taxation created a deadlock in government. A constitutional court ruled in 1963 Makarios had failed to uphold article 173 of the constitution which called for the establishment of separate municipalities for Turkish Cypriots. Makarios subsequently declared his intention to ignore the judgement, resulting in the West German judge resigning from his position. Makarios proposed thirteen amendments to the constitution, which would have had the effect of resolving most of the issues in the Greek Cypriot favour. Under the proposals, the President and Vice-President would lose their veto, the separate municipalities as sought after by the Turkish Cypriots would be abandoned, the need for separate majorities by both communities in passing legislation would be discarded and the civil service contribution would be set at actual population ratios (82:18) instead of the slightly higher figure for Turkish Cypriots.

The intention behind the amendments has long been called into question. The Akritas plan, written in the height of the constitutional dispute by the Greek Cypriot interior minister Polycarpos Georkadjis, called for the removal of undesirable elements of the constitution so as to allow power-sharing to work. The plan envisaged a swift retaliatory attack on Turkish Cypriot strongholds should Turkish Cypriots resort to violence to resist the measures, stating “In the event of a planned or staged Turkish attack, it is imperative to overcome it by force in the shortest possible time, because if we succeed in gaining command of the situation (in one or two days), no outside, intervention would be either justified or possible.” Whether Makarios's proposals were part of the Akritas plan is unclear, however it remains that sentiment towards enosis had not completely disappeared with independence. Makarios described independence as "a step on the road to enosis". Preparations for conflict were not entirely absent from Turkish Cypriots either, with right wing elements still believing taksim (partition) the best safeguard against enosis.

Greek Cypriots however believe the amendments were a necessity stemming from a perceived attempt by Turkish Cypriots to frustrate the working of government. Turkish Cypriots saw it as a means to reduce their status within the state from one of co-founder to that of minority, seeing it as a first step towards enosis. The security situation deteriorated rapidly.

Intercommunal violence

An armed conflict was triggered after December 21, 1963, a period remembered by Turkish Cypriots as Bloody Christmas, when a Greek Cypriot policemen that had been called to help deal with a taxi driver refusing officers already on the scene access to check the identification documents of his customers, took out his gun upon arrival and shot and killed the taxi driver and his partner. Eric Solsten summarised the events as follows: "a Greek Cypriot police patrol, ostensibly checking identification documents, stopped a Turkish Cypriot couple on the edge of the Turkish quarter. A hostile crowd gathered, shots were fired, and two Turkish Cypriots were killed."

In the morning after the shooting, crowds gathered in protest in Northern Nicosia, likely encouraged by the TMT, without incident. On the evening of the 22nd, gunfire broke out, communication lines to the Turkish neighbourhoods were cut, and the Greek Cypriot police occupied the nearby airport. On the 23rd, a ceasefire was negotiated, but did not hold. Fighting, including automatic weapons fire, between Greek and Turkish Cypriots and militias increased in Nicosia and Larnaca. A force of Greek Cypriot irregulars led by Nikos Sampson entered the Nicosia suburb of Omorphita and engaged in heavy firing on armed, as well as by some accounts unarmed, Turkish Cypriots. The Omorphita clash has been described by Turkish Cypriots as a massacre, while this view has generally not been acknowledged by Greek Cypriots.

Further ceasefires were arranged between the two sides, but also failed. By Christmas Eve, the 24th, Britain, Greece, and Turkey had joined talks, with all sides calling for a truce. On Christmas day, Turkish fighter jets overflew Nicosia in a show of support. Finally it was agreed to allow a force of 2,700 British soldiers to help enforce a ceasefire. In the next days, a "buffer zone" was created in Nicosia, and a British officer marked a line on a map with green ink, separating the two sides of the city, which was the beginning of the "Green Line". Fighting continued across the island for the next several weeks.

In total 364 Turkish Cypriots and 174 Greek Cypriots were killed during the violence. 25,000 Turkish Cypriots from 103-109 villages fled and were displaced into enclaves and thousands of Turkish Cypriot houses were ransacked or completely destroyed.

Contemporary newspapers also reported on the forceful exodus of the Turkish Cypriots from their homes. According to The Times in 1964, threats, shootings and attempts of arson were committed against the Turkish Cypriots to force them out of their homes. The Daily Express wrote that "25,000 Turks have already been forced to leave their homes". The Guardian reported a massacre of Turks at Limassol on 16 February 1964.

Turkey had by now readied its fleet and its fighter jets appeared over Nicosia. Turkey was dissuaded from direct involvement by the creation of a United Nations Peacekeeping Force in Cyprus (UNFICYP) in 1964. Despite the negotiated ceasefire in Nicosia, attacks on the Turkish Cypriot persisted, particularly in Limassol. Concerned about the possibility of a Turkish invasion, Makarios undertook the creation of a Greek Cypriot conscript-based army called the “National Guard”. A general from Greece took charge of the army, whilst a further 20,000 well-equipped officers and men were smuggled from Greece into Cyprus. Turkey threatened to intervene once more, but was prevented by a strongly worded  letter from the American President Lyndon B. Johnson, anxious to avoid a conflict between NATO allies Greece and Turkey at the height of the Cold War.

Turkish Cypriots had by now established an important bridgehead at Kokkina, provided with arms, volunteers and materials from Turkey and abroad. Seeing this incursion of foreign weapons and troops as a major threat, the Cypriot government invited George Grivas to return from Greece as commander of the Greek troops on the island and launch a major attack on the bridgehead. Turkey retaliated by dispatching its fighter jets to bomb Greek positions, causing Makarios to threaten an attack on every Turkish Cypriot village on the island if the bombings did not cease. The conflict had now drawn in Greece and Turkey, with both countries amassing troops on their Thracian borders. Efforts at mediation by Dean Acheson, a former U.S. Secretary of State, and UN-appointed mediator Galo Plaza had failed, all the while the division of the two communities becoming more apparent. Greek Cypriot forces were estimated at some 30,000, including the National Guard and the large contingent from Greece. Defending the Turkish Cypriot enclaves was a force of approximately 5,000 irregulars, led by a Turkish colonel, but lacking the equipment and organisation of the Greek forces.

The Secretary-General of the United Nations in 1964, U Thant, reported the damage during the conflicts:

UNFICYP carried out a detailed survey of all damage to properties throughout the island during the disturbances; it shows that in 109 villages, most of them Turkish-Cypriot or mixed villages, 527 houses have been destroyed while 2,000 others have suffered damage from looting.

Crisis of 1967 
The situation worsened in 1967, when a military junta overthrew the democratically elected government of Greece, and began applying pressure on Makarios to achieve enosis. Makarios, not wishing to become part of a military dictatorship or trigger a Turkish invasion, began to distance himself from the goal of enosis. This caused tensions with the junta in Greece as well as George Grivas in Cyprus. Grivas's control over the National Guard and Greek contingent was seen as a threat to Makarios's position, who now feared a possible coup. Grivas escalated the conflict when his armed units began patrolling the Turkish Cypriot enclaves of Ayios Theodhoros and Kophinou, and on November 15 engaged in heavy fighting with the Turkish Cypriots.

By the time of his withdrawal 26 Turkish Cypriots had been killed. Turkey replied with an ultimatum demanding that Grivas be removed from the island, that the troops smuggled from Greece in excess of the limits of the Treaty of Alliance be removed, and that the economic blockades on the Turkish Cypriot enclaves be lifted. Grivas resigned his position and 12,000 Greek troops were withdrawn. Makarios now attempted to consolidate his position by reducing the number of National Guard troops, and by creating a paramilitary force loyal to Cypriot independence. In 1968, acknowledging that enosis was now all but impossible, Makarios stated, "A solution by necessity must be sought within the limits of what is feasible which does not always coincide with the limits of what is desirable."

Greek Cypriot coup
 
After 1967 tensions between the Greek and Turkish Cypriots subsided. Instead, the main source of tension on the island came from factions within the Greek Cypriot community. Although Makarios had effectively abandoned enosis in favour of an ‘attainable solution’, many others continued to believe that the only legitimate political aspiration for Greek Cypriots was union with Greece.

On his arrival, Grivas began by establishing a nationalist paramilitary group known as the National Organization of Cypriot Fighters (Ethniki Organosis Kyprion Agoniston B or EOKA-B), drawing comparisons with the EOKA struggle for enosis under the British colonial administration of the 1950s.

The military junta in Athens saw Makarios as an obstacle. Makarios's failure to disband the National Guard, whose officer class was dominated by mainland Greeks, had meant the junta had practical control over the Cypriot military establishment, leaving Makarios isolated and a vulnerable target.

Turkish invasion
 

Turkish invasion and peace talks

During the first Turkish invasion, Turkish troops invaded Cyprus territory on 20 July, 1974, invoking its rights under the Treaty of Guarantee. This expansion of Turkish-occupied zone violated International Law as well as the Charter of the United Nations. Turkish troops managed to capture 3% of the island which was accompanied by the burning of the Turkish Cypriot quarter, as well as the raping and killing of women and children. A temporary cease-fire followed which was mitigated by the UN Security Council. Subsequently, the Greek military Junta collapsed on July 23rd, 1974, and peace talks commenced in which a democratic government was installed. The Resolution 353 was broken after Turkey attacked a second time and managed to get a hold of 37% of Cyprus territory. The Island of Cyprus was appointed a Buffer Zone by the United Nations, which divided the island into two zones through the ‘Green Line’ and put an end to the Turkish invasion. Although Turkey announced that the occupied areas of Cyprus to be called the Federated Turkish State in 1975, it is not legitimised on a worldwide political scale. The United Nations called for the international recognition of independence for the Republic of Cyprus in the Security Council Resolution 367.

Aftermath

In the years after the Turkish invasion of northern Cyprus one can observe a history of failed talks between the two parties. The 1983 declaration of the independent Turkish Republic of Cyprus resulted in a  rise of inter-communal tensions and made it increasingly hard to find mutual understanding. With Cyprus’ interest of a possible EU membership and a new UN Secretary-General Kofi Annan in 1997 new hopes arose for a fresh start. International involvement from sides of the US and UK, wanting a solution to the Cyprus dispute prior to the EU accession led to political pressures for new talks. The believe that an accession without a solution would threaten Greek-Turkish relations and acknowledge the partition of the island would direct the coming negotiations.

Over the course of two years a concrete plan, the Annan plan was formulated. In 2004 the fifth version agreed upon from both sides and with the endorsement of Turkey, US, UK and EU then was presented to the public and was given a referendum in both Cypriot communities to assure the legitimisation of the resolution. The Turkish Cypriots voted with 65% for the plan, however the Greek Cypriots voted with a 76% majority against. The Annan plan contained multiple important topics. Firstly it established a confederation of two separate states called the United Cyprus Republic. Both communities would have autonomous states combined under one unified government. The members of parliament would be chosen according to the percentage in population numbers to ensure a just involvement from both communities. The paper proposed a demilitarisation of the island over the next years. Furthermore it agreed upon a number of 45000 Turkish settlers that could remain on the island. These settlers became a very important issue concerning peace talks. Originally the Turkish government encouraged Turks to settle in Cyprus providing transfer and property, to establish a counterpart to the Greek Cypriot population due to their 1 to 5 minority. With the economic situation many Turkish-Cypriot decided to leave the island, however their departure is made up by incoming Turkish settlers leaving the population ratio between Turkish Cypriots and Greek Cypriots stable. However all these points where criticised and as seen in the vote rejected mainly by the Greek Cypriots. These name the dissolution of the „Republic of Cyprus“, economic consequences of a reunion and the remaining Turkish settlers as reason. Many claim that the plan was indeed drawing more from Turkish-Cypriot demands then Greek-Cypriot interests. Taking in consideration that the US wanted to keep Turkey as a strategic partner in future Middle Eastern conflicts.

A week after the failed referendum the Republic of Cyprus joined the EU. In multiple instances the EU tried to promote trade with Northern Cyprus but without internationally recognised ports this spiked a grand debate. Both side endure their intention of negotiations, however without the prospect of any new compromises or agreements the UN is unwilling to start the process again. Since 2004 negotiations took place in numbers but without any results, both sides are strongly holding on to their position without an agreeable solution in sight that would suit both parties.

See also
 Modern history of Cyprus
 Turkish Resistance Organisation
 Civilian casualties and displacements during the Cyprus conflict

References

Sources

Further reading 
Report s/5950 (10 September 1964) by the Secretary-General

External links
 Cyprus-Conflict.net An independent and comprehensive website dedicated to the Cyprus conflict, containing a detailed narrative as well as documents, reports and eye-witness accounts.
 Library of Congress Cyprus Country Study Detailed information on Cyprus, covering the various phases of the Cyprus conflict.

20th-century conflicts
1955 in Cyprus
1958 in Cyprus
1963 in Cyprus
1964 in Cyprus
Intercommunal violence
Civil wars involving the states and peoples of Asia
Civil wars involving the states and peoples of Europe
Civil wars post-1945
Ethnicity-based civil wars
Sectarian violence
Conflicts in 1955
Conflicts in 1956
Conflicts in 1957
Conflicts in 1958
Conflicts in 1959
Conflicts in 1960
Conflicts in 1961
Conflicts in 1962
Conflicts in 1963
Conflicts in 1964